Challwaqucha (Quechua challwa fish, qucha lake, "fish lake", Hispanicized spelling Chalhuacocha) is a mountain in the Andes of Peru, about  high, with a small lake of the same name. It is located in the Junín Region, Yauli Province, Morococha District, southwest of Yawarqucha and Yuraqqucha.

References

Mountains of Peru
Mountains of Junín Region
Lakes of Peru
Lakes of Junín Region